Bohumil Říha (22 February 1907 – 15 December 1987) was a Czechoslovak writer best known for children's books. For his lasting contribution to children's literature he received the Hans Christian Andersen Medal in 1980.

Career
One of his most noted works is Children's Encyclopaedia (1959) that has since its publication enjoyed almost a cult following – its structure offers, besides information for beginning readers, more detailed information for children who wish to learn more about any of the subjects.

Other works include The River (1962, co-authored by Karel Friedrich), The Great Picture Book for Children (1976), The Great Animal Picture Book (1981; both together with Milena Lukešová), and Merry Tales – And What Else? (1964).

He died in Prague.

The biennial Hans Christian Andersen Award conferred by the International Board on Books for Young People is the highest recognition available to a writer or illustrator of children's books. Jansson received the writing award in 1966.

Works 

 Čech Země dokořán, 1950
 Dvě jara, 1952
 Venkovan, 1955 – first part, 1958 – second part
 Doktor Meluzin, 1973 filmed under the title Dým bramborové natě
 Divný člověk
 O rezavém rváči a huňatém pánovi, 1971
Trilogy about the rule of George of Poděbrady:
 Přede mnou poklekni, 1971
 Čekání na krále, 1977
 A zbyl jen meč, 1978

Children's books 

 O lékaři Pingovi, 1941
 O třech penízcích, 1941
 Honzíkova cesta, 1954
 O letadélku Káněti, 1957
 Pět bohů táhne přes moře
 Jak vodníci udobřili sumce
 Dva kluci v palbě
 Velká obrázková knížka pro malé děti, 1959, co author M. Lukešová
 Divoký koník Ryn
 Jak jel Vítek do Prahy
 Dětská encyklopedie, illustrations Vladimír Fuka; 1959, 1962, 1966, 1971''

See also

References

1907 births
1987 deaths
Czechoslovak children's writers
Hans Christian Andersen Award for Writing winners
Socialist realism writers
People from Tábor District